My (Not So) Perfect Life is a young adult novel by Dyan Sheldon.  The sequel to Confessions of a Teenage Drama Queen, it was released in 2002.

Critical reception
Bethanne Patrick in her Washington Post review said "It’s all very silly until someone gets hurt — and someone does. However, what ensues has a touch of real wisdom in its slapstick hand that will satisfy Kinsella die-hards as well as new readers."

Plot
The story centers on Lola's best friend, Ella. School elections for student body president are being held at Dellwood High. Lola wants to run against Carla Santini but can't because she hasn't been class representative for one term. So instead Lola enters Ella and Sam to be candidates and run against Carla.

References

External links

2002 American novels
American young adult novels
Candlewick Press books
Sequel novels
Novels set in New Jersey